This is a list of seasons completed by the Notre Dame Fighting Irish men's college basketball team.

Seasons

References

 
Notre Dame Fighting Irish
Notre Dame Fighting Irish basketball seasons